Vanessa Louise Atkinson (born 10 March 1976 in Newcastle, England) is a former professional squash player from the Netherlands, who won the World Open in 2004 and reached the World No. 1 ranking in December 2005. 

Atkinson was born in England, but her family moved to the Netherlands when she was still a child. She began playing squash as a youngster in Dordrecht. She now resides in Harrogate, Yorkshire, with her partner James Willstrop, himself a professional squash player.

Atkinson's biggest win came in 2004 when she won the World Open title in Kuala Lumpur by defeating fellow compatriote Natalie Grinham (at that time still representing Australia) with a score of 9–1, 9–1, 9–5 in the final. Atkinson also has won major tournaments in Qatar, New York, Monte Carlo, Malaysia and Ireland.

Atkinson retired from professional play in May 2011.

World Open

Finals: 1 (1 title, 0 runner-up)

Major World Series final appearances

Qatar Classic: 2 finals (2 titles, 0 runner-up)

Malaysian Open: 2 finals (1 title, 1 runner-up)

See also
 Official Women's Squash World Ranking
 List of WISPA number 1 ranked players
 WISPA Awards

References

External links 

Interview at Squashtalk.com - June 1999
 

Dutch people of English descent
English female squash players
Dutch female squash players
English emigrants to the Netherlands
1976 births
Living people
Sportspeople from Newcastle upon Tyne